Microcaecilia iwokramae is a species of caecilian in the family Siphonopidae. It is endemic to Guyana and only known from its type locality in the Iwokrama Forest. It was first described as Caecilita iwokramae in the monotypic genus Caecilita, before being recognised as belonging to Microcaecilia.

Description
Microcaecilia iwokramae was first thought to be the second known species of lungless caecilian and first from a terrestrial habitat, the other lungless species being the aquatic Atretochoana eiselti. Microcaecilia iwokramae is small and terrestrial, and does have a lung. Its colour in life was not recorded, but in preservative it was light yellow-brown with mottling. Unlike previously reported, this species does have open external nares, and possesses a single, well-developed lung, and it is similar to other Microcaecilia in having an orbit mostly covered by bone (closed).

Habitat and conservation
It appears to be reasonably common in the vicinity of the type locality. Specimens could be found by digging soil, particularly under rotting wood or leaf litter or between the buttress roots of trees.

References 

iwokramae
Endemic fauna of Guyana
Amphibians of Guyana
Amphibians described in 2010
Taxa named by Maureen Ann Donnelly
Taxa named by David B. Wake